The COVID-19 pandemic in Niue is part of the ongoing worldwide pandemic of coronavirus disease 2019 caused by severe acute respiratory syndrome coronavirus 2. Niue reported its first confirmed case on 9 March 2022.

Background 
On 12 January 2020, the World Health Organization (WHO) confirmed that a novel coronavirus was the cause of a respiratory illness in a cluster of people in Wuhan, Hubei Province, China, which was reported to the WHO on 31 December 2019.

The case fatality ratio for COVID-19 has been much lower than SARS of 2003, but the transmission has been significantly greater, with a significant total death toll.

Niue along with the Cook Islands were formally annexed into the Realm of New Zealand on 11 June 1901. Niue became a self-governing territory in free association with New Zealand on 9 October 1974. As an associated state, Niue remains constitutionally part of the Realm of New Zealand. Niueans also retain New Zealand nationality, open access to New Zealand, and receive budgetary assistance. Niue is also not a member of the United Nations.

Timeline
On 9 March 2022, the country reported its first case of COVID-19 as the result of travel from New Zealand.

On 24 March, four new cases were reported at the border as a result of travel from New Zealand. All four cases are asymptomatic and include two children under the age of three years. In response, Premier Dalton Tagelagi moved Niue into Alert Level Yellow, which is the second of the three alert levels for Niue's response to COVID-19.

By 30 March, two new cases were reported, bringing the total number of active cases to six. Tegelagi criticised relatives of infected individuals for lingering outside Managed Isolation and Quarantine (MIQ) facilities. He advised them not to chat with patients while dropping off food at MIQ facilities.

On 1 July, five passengers on a flight from New Zealand carrying 118 passengers tested positive for COVID-19. In response, Niuean authorities tested the other passengers and launched contact tracing to identify close contacts of the infected individuals.

On 30 July, Niue reported its first four community cases. By that time, the island country had reported 30 COVID-19 cases at the border. Late that day, the number of new cases had risen to nine.

Responses
In response to the global COVID-19 pandemic in March 2020, the Niuean government banned visitors from highly affected countries, and later all arrivals except for Niue residents and essential services people only.

Since March 2021, Niue had a one-way travel bubble which allowed Niueans to travel to New Zealand without quarantine. From 24 March 2021, travellers from Niue were allowed to resume quarantine free travel into New Zealand.

Following the island state's first reported case on 8 March 2022, Niue tightened its border restrictions with the goal of eliminating COVID-19. Travellers were required to have a polymerase chain reaction (PCR) test 48 hours before departing from New Zealand to Niue.  On 6 April 2022, the Government revised the policy by requiring travellers to Niue to undertake rapid antigen testing before departing for Niue.

After nine new cases were reported on 30 July, Niuean authorities moved the country to COVID-19 Alert Code Red but did not implement a lockdown.

COVID-19 vaccination
On 9 July 2021, Niue completed its initial vaccination rollout, which included everyone aged 16 years or older. 97% of the eligible population has been fully vaccinated using the Pfizer Comirnaty vaccine.

As of 1 August 2021, a total of 2,352 vaccine doses have been administered. Niue commenced their vaccination campaign the week beginning 31 May 2021.

See also
 COVID-19 pandemic in Oceania

References

COVID-19 pandemic in Niue
Niue
Niue
Niue
2020 in Niue
2021 in Niue
2022 in Niue